Gishigan (also Romanized as Gīshīgān; also known as Gīshīgān-e Pā’īn and Gīshīgān-e Soflá) is a village in Hoseynabad-e Goruh Rural District, Rayen District, Kerman County, Kerman Province, Iran. At the 2006 census, its population was 71, in 25 families.

References 

Populated places in Kerman County